Umberto Vergine is an Italian businessman. He was appointed chief executive officer of Saipem on 5 December 2012.

Biography
Umberto Vergine graduated with a degree in Civil Engineering from the Polytechnic University of Milan.
He started his career as a petroleum engineer in 1984 with Agip (part of Eni Group).
Between 1985 and 1991, he worked in Norway on the Ekofisk field for the Phillips Petroleum Company, and later with Chevron in the province of Cabinda, Angola and in Tripoli, Libya. 
In 1992, he was appointed Production Manager of the Agip Crema District. Subsequently, between 1993 and 2001, Vergine held various overseas management positions at a number of Eni’s E&P foreign subsidiaries/ branches, including District Manager of Agip UK in Aberdeen, UK; District general manager of NAOC in Port Harcourt, Nigeria; and general manager and managing director of Petrobel in Cairo, Egypt.
In March 2001, he was appointed managing director of Lasmo in Caracas, Venezuela, and at the end of 2002, managing director of Ieoc in Cairo.
After returning to Italy in 2004, Vergine held positions in Eni’s E&P Division, including: Regional Vice President West Africa and Egypt; Senior Vice President Northern Europe, North and South America, Russia and the Far East; Senior Vice President, Technologies and Services; and, finally, Executive Vice President, Europe, Central Asia and the Far East.
In 2010, he was appointed as Eni’s Senior Executive Vice President in charge of Strategic Studies and R&D. In addition, he served on the board of directors of Saipem S.p.A., Eni Trading & Shipping, the Eni Foundation, and represented Eni on the Board of the Foundation for the Polytechnic University of Milan.
Between 1 January 2012 and 5 December 2012, he was the chief operating officer of the Eni S.p.A. Gas & Power Division.

Saipem career
A member of the Saipem Board since 2010, Umberto Vergine was appointed chief executive officer on 5 December 2012, following the resignation of Pietro Franco Tali, who was under investigation, along with a number of other senior managers, for alleged corruption offences in Algeria. He was also, simultaneously, in charge of the Engineering and Construction Business Unit for a period of time. His mandate as chief executive officer of Saipem was extended by the board of directors in May 2014.

Notes

External links
 Profile of Umberto Vergine on Saipem’s website
 Profile of Umberto Vergine on Bloomberg Business

Italian chief executives
Polytechnic University of Milan alumni
Italian engineers
Living people
20th-century Italian businesspeople
21st-century Italian businesspeople
Year of birth missing (living people)